Konteradmiral, abbreviated KAdm or KADM, is the second lowest naval flag officer rank in the German Navy. It is equivalent to Generalmajor in the Heer and Luftwaffe or to Admiralstabsarzt and Generalstabsarzt in the Zentraler Sanitätsdienst der Bundeswehr.

In the German Navy Konteradmiral is equivalent to rear admiral, a two-star rank with a NATO code of OF-7. However, in the former German-speaking naval forces of the Imperial German Navy (Kaiserliche Marine), the Nazi Kriegsmarine, the East German Volksmarine and the Austro-Hungarian K.u.K. Kriegsmarine, Konteradmiral was an OF-6 one-star officer rank.

Address
The official manner of formal addressing of military people with the rank Konteradmiral is "Herr/Frau Konteradmiral". In German naval tradition any flag officer rank may be addressed "Herr/Frau Admiral".

Rank insignia and rating

The rank insignia, worn on the sleeves and shoulders, is a single five-pointed star above a single normal stripe and a wide stripe. The star is omitted on rank loops. Konteradmiral is a B7 grade in the pay rules of the Federal Ministry of Defence.

The sequence of ranks in decreasing seniority is:
OF-9: Admiral / General
OF-8: Vizeadmiral / Generalleutnant
OF-7: Konteradmiral / Generalmajor
OF-6: Flottillenadmiral / Brigadegeneral

History

Imperial German Navy and Kriegsmarine

In the Kaiserliche Marine and Kriegsmarine, Konteradmiral was an OF-6 one-star officer rank equivalent to a Heer or Luftwaffe Generalmajor, and to an SS-Brigadeführer and Generalmajor of the Waffen-SS.

The rank insignia consisted of shoulder strap and sleeve stripes. Shoulder straps had to be worn on uniform jackets and consisted of twisted gold-braids (no pips or stars) on padding in navy blue weapon color.

Cuff insignia consisted of one golden big stripe, one normal stripe, and a five-point naval star above. The sleeve rings encircled the lower cuffs.

The last surviving Kriegsmarine Konteradmiral, Eberhard Godt, died at the age of 95 on 13 September 1995.

K.u.K. Kriegsmarine
In the Austro-Hungarian K.u.K. Kriegsmarine (1849 to 1918) there were the flag officer ranks Kontreadmiral (also spelled Konteradmiral in the 20th century), Viceadmiral , Admiral and Großadmiral.

National People's Army

Konteradmiral (OF-6) was the lowest flag officer grade of the Volksamarine, equivalent to the one-star rank Generalmajor (OF-6 as well).

In the GDR Volksmarine there were three flag officer ranks: Konteradmiral, Vizeadmiral, and Admiral. The GDR State Council decided from 25 March 25, 1982 to introduce the rank of Flottenadmiral
.
Konteradmirals of the GDR Volksmarine

See also List of admirals of Germany: ''Konteradmirals

References

Naval ranks
Naval ranks of Germany
Admirals
One-star officers of Nazi Germany
Two-star officers of the Bundeswehr